The Kyiv Passage (as in the French word Passage) is a building complex with a small, narrow street (passage) stretched through it. The street address of the building is Khreshchatyk, 15, city of Kyiv. Located between two parallel streets Khreshchatyk and vulytsia Zankovetskoyi, the passage runs parallel to vulytsia Arkhitektora Horodetskoho.

The street has many small outdoor cafés and shopping stores on the buildings' first floors and residential apartments on the upper floors.

External links

 Aleksandr Anisimov, "Wow! What a Passage!" Something about early trade., Kievskiy Telegraf, №5 (195), January 30 - February 5, 2004. 

Buildings and structures in Kyiv
Culture in Kyiv
Art Nouveau architecture in Kyiv